Mothers against repression or Mothers and women against repression ( - ) is a human rights organization based in Miami, Florida, United States that campaigns against political repression in Cuba.

See also
Ladies in White

References

Human rights organizations based in the United States
Human rights in Cuba
Political repression in Cuba